Deltophora duplicata is a moth of the family Gelechiidae. It is found in the United States (Florida), the Cayman Islands, Mexico (Tamaulipas) and El Salvador.

The length of the forewings is 4.5-5.5 mm. The forewings are gray, gray-brown or pale ocherous, with black markings. Adults have been recorded on wing in February, May, July and August.

References

Moths described in 1979
Deltophora
Taxa named by Klaus Sattler